Stjepan Šejić (born November 27, 1981) is a Croatian comic book writer and artist, known for his work on the series Witchblade, Aphrodite IX, Sunstone, and The Darkness among others.

Career
Šejić was born in Vinkovci and resides in Crikvenica, Croatia. Before he started as a comic book artist, he wanted to become a lawyer.  Šejić started his career as a colorist, painting covers drawn by Tyler Kirkham. He was mainly inspired by Italian comics before he stumbled upon a copy of Top Cow's Witchblade, which inspired his own art. His work is also influenced by Marc Silvestri and Michael Turner.

In 2007, Šejić signed up to draw the art for  Witchblade from issue #116 to #150, the longest run of the series drawn by a single artist once completed. He also illustrated the Witchblade miniseries First Born and Broken Trinity, and covers of the Top Cow series The Darkness.  He also cooperates with smaller publishers such as Arcana Studio and Dynamite Entertainment.  In 2020, Šejić announced his departure from the mainstream comic book industry, choosing instead to focus on his creator-owned works.

Šejić is married to fellow Croatian artist Linda Lukšić Šejić.

Bibliography

Interior art

Arcana Studios
Arcana Studio Presents: Free Comic Book Day #2006–07
Kade: Sun of Perdition  #1–4 (2006–07)

DC Comics

Image Comics / Top Cow
Angelus  #1–6 (2009–10)
Angelus Pilot Season  #1 (2007)
Aphrodite IX (2013)
Art of Witchblade, one-shot (2008)
Artifacts #0-25 (2010–13)
Broken Trinity #1–3 (2008)
Darkness Level, 5-part miniseries, (covers and interiors): #1–2; (covers): #3–4 (2006–07)
Death Vigil  #1–present (2014-)
Fine Print #1-present (2021-)
First Born #1–3 (2007-2008)
First Look, one-shot (2007)
Aftermath, one-shot (2008)
Prelude (2008)
Sunstone (2011-)
Rat Queens #9–10 (2015)
Witchblade #105–107, #116–138, #140–141, #144–145 (2007–11)
Ravine (2013–2014)

Radical Publishing
Aladdin: Legacy Of The Lost #2–3 (2010)

Writer

 Sunstone† (2011-)
 Death Vigil† #1–present (2014-)
 Fine Print† #1-present (2021-)

Cover art
Arcana Studios
Ezra vs. 10th Muse #1 (2006)
Ezra: Evoked Emotions #1–3 (2006–07)

DC
Batman: Arkham Knight-Genesis #1–6 (2015–2016)
Suicide Squad #26 (2017)
Nightwing #29 (2017)
Teen Titans #12 (2017)
Green Arrow #32 (2017)
Aquaman #25–#33 (2017–2018)
Justice League Odyssey (2018–Present)

Dynamite Entertainment
Army of Darkness #9–17 (2009)
Home Sweet Hell #10
King For A Dav #13 (2008)
The Long Road Home #6–8 (2008)
Battlestar Galactica #5–8 (2007)
Season Zero #1–8 (2007–2008)
Zarek #1–4 (2006–2007)
Brothers in Arms #1–4 (2008)
Painkiller Jane: Everything Explodes, Part 1 (2007)
Pathfinder: Origins #2 (2015)
Red Sonja Annual 2006
Savage Red Sonja: Queen of the Frozen Wastes #2–4 (2006)
Savage Tales #2–4 (2007)
Savage Tales: The Witches Familiar #1 (2007)
Savage Tales: Beautiful Creatures/Sellsword #5 (2007)
Terminator: Revolution (2008)
Terminator 2: Infinity #1–5 (2007)
Xena: Warrior Princess: Dark Xena #1–4 (2007)
Xena: Warrior Princess Annual #1

Image Comics / Top Cow
Ant v2 #10 (cover B) (2007)
Aftermath (2009)
Commanders in Crisis #1 (2020)
Cyberforce/Hunter-Killer #2 (2009)
Cyblade #3 (2009)
Darkness #75 (2009)
Darkness: Empire #1–6 (2007–08)
Darkness/Pitt #1–3 (2009)
Darkness/Witchblade/Angelus Trinity: Blood On The Sands (2009)
Darkness/Wolverine: Old Wounds (painting over Tyler Kirkham pencils), one-shot (2006)
Deep Beyond #1 (2021)
Dragon Prince #1 (Sept. 2008)
Fusion: Gods & Monsters #1 (2009)
Helm Greycastle #2 (2021)
Magdalena/Daredevil, one-shot (2008)
Mirka Andolfo's Sweet Paprika #2 (2021)
Rat Queens #25 (2021)
Unholy Union #1 (2007)
Witchblade/Devi #1 (2008)

Marvel
Realm Of Kings: Inhumans #1–5 (2010)
Secret Invasion: Inhumans #1–4 (2009)
She-Hulk: Cosmic Collision (2009)
X-Men: Endangered Species (2007)

Radical Publishing
Freedom Formula #3–5 (2008)
Hercules: The Thracian Wars (2008)
Hotwire: Requiem for the Dead - Dead Letters #2 (2009)
Hotwire: Requiem for the Dead - Read Me First #1 (2009)

Zenescope Entertainment
1001 Arabian Nights: The Adventures of Sinbad
Grimm Fairy Tales #1, 6 (2007–08)

Video games
Serious Sam 3: BFE (high-polygon character model art, artbook) (2011)

References

External links 
 Nebezial
 Shiniez (Sunstone)
 Wanderers of Ravine (webcomic)

Living people
1981 births
BDSM people
People from Vinkovci
Croatian comics artists
Croatian illustrators
Croatian comics writers
Witchblade